Jack Dyson (8 July 1934 – 22 November 2000) was both an English first-class cricketer and a professional footballer. He was born and died in Oldham, Lancashire.

He started his sporting career as a footballer and spent four seasons with Manchester City during which time he played 62 matches and scored 26 goals. One of those goals came in their 1956 FA Cup Final victory over Birmingham.

After leaving football he concentrated on his cricketing career, which had already begun while he was with Manchester City. A right-handed batsman and handy offspinner, he made his first-class debut in 1954, playing with Lancashire. He earned his Lancashire Cap two years later in 1956, the same year that he had won his FA Cup winner's medal. In that season he scored what would be his only first-class hundred, 118 not out against Scotland. He also played in an unusual victory over Leicestershire as it was achieved without losing a wicket, with two opening partnerships of 166 and 66 between Dyson and Alan Wharton enough to give a victory by 10 wickets.

Dyson was a controversial figure throughout his career, he was a free spirit and it ended up costing him his job at Lancashire. In 1960 the Lancashire committee charged him with "a serious breach of discipline and an act of insubordination and insolence to the captain".

For the next two years Dyson played with Staffordshire and in league cricket. In September 1962 the Lancashire committee was overthrown and Dyson returned to the county for two more seasons, but was released again at the end of the 1964 season.

Honours 
 FA Cup winner 1956

References

1934 births
2000 deaths
English cricketers
Lancashire cricketers
Staffordshire cricketers
English footballers
Manchester City F.C. players
English Football League players
Stirling Albion F.C. players
Scottish Football League players
Northwich Victoria F.C. players
Nelson F.C. players
Association football inside forwards
People from Oldham
FA Cup Final players